I Can Make You Love Me, also known as Stalking Laura, is an American 1993 made-for-television psychological thriller film starring Richard Thomas and Brooke Shields. The film is based on the real-life story of American mass murderer Richard Farley, a former employee of ESL Incorporated whose romantic obsession and subsequent stalking of co-worker Laura Black culminated in the mass murder of several co-workers at ESL's headquarters in California, resulting in the first anti-stalking laws to be enacted in the United States.

Plot

Laura Black, a young and ambitious intern from Virginia, accepts a job at Kensitron Electronics International (KEI) in Silicon Valley, California. During a tour of her new workplace, Laura meets long-time KEI employee Richard Farley. Richard invites her to a local tractor pull, but she politely refuses. She later visits an apartment in Sunnyvale, and is accepted as a new roommate by the current tenant.

On her first day at the office, Richard is waiting at her new work station with fresh-baked blueberry bread to show his affections. In the days that follow, Laura enrolls in a local aerobics class. When the class dismisses, Richard meets Laura in the parking lot and asks her out, but she politely refuses and informs him that their relationship is only professional.

Richard continues to make advances on Laura. At a KEI softball game, Laura once again denies that their relationship extends outside the workplace. During the game, Laura's new friend and co-worker Glenda Moritz takes note of Richard's infatuation with her. Richard also becomes offended when he notices Laura and Glenda looking toward him laughing.

Through an excuse of wanting to present a staff birthday celebration for Laura, Richard is permitted by a coworker to see her personal dossier, from which he learns of her birthday and address, later showing up at her apartment with a gift. When her roommate says she should inform KEI management of the apparent stalking, Laura insists that she can handle Richard.

Laura later finds her tires slashed at her home. She calls the police about the incident and suspects Richard as the culprit. Richard later confronts Laura on her suspicions. Laura finally approaches KEI management to file a formal complaint; but management brushes it off. However, management instructs Richard to leave her alone at work, which he skirts by enrolling in the same non-work aerobics class as Laura. Richard later photographs Laura from the yard in front of her house, and uses the photos to doctor a picture of himself and Laura together. Laura and her roommate relocate to a new apartment, which is gated for added security.

Richard later sneaks into Laura's office after hours and discovers her new address, as well as her family records. Richard then threatens to go after one of Laura's sisters if Laura does not accept that she "is meant for him." While visiting her family for Christmas in Virginia, a gift arrives: the above-mentioned doctored photograph of the two of them together. Laura then files a second complaint at KEI upon her return, again with little effect.

After being obligated to attend a counseling session at work, an enraged Richard confronts Laura in the ladies' restroom at a restaurant, threatening her for not accepting his advances. Laura reports the incident to KEI management, and Richard declares that he will kill anyone who attempts to interfere with his "private relationships." He is later fired, though Laura is told it was because the quality of his work went down.

The harassment continues on an irregular basis. Laura begins dating Sam Waters, who fears for Laura's safety. To protect her, Sam teaches her how to use a gun for self-defense. When Richard breaks into her garage and leaves a note on her windshield, Laura confronts him and he casually brushes it off with yet another advance. At work, Laura receives a major promotion that is delayed when she is unable to obtain security clearance. Thinking the delay is because of Richard's harassment, Laura's supervisor Chris convinces Laura to serve papers on Richard for a restraining order.

Enraged by the restraining order, Richard purchases numerous guns and over 2000 rounds of ammunition. At work, Laura is looking forward to her upcoming court appearance for the restraining order to become permanent. On that same day, Richard arrives at the KEI offices in an RV, bringing numerous shotguns, revolvers and explosives. He blasts his way through the lobby and into the secure offices, shooting several employees and killing Glenda along the way. Richard bursts into Laura's office, shooting her in the left shoulder and leaving her for dead, though she is only unconscious.

SWAT units arrive and evacuate most of the building, though Richard remains holed up with dozens of hostages. While hostage negotiator Lt. Grijalva speaks with Richard; Laura, although weakened due to loss of blood, makes her way through the ransacked offices. Richard attempts to convince Lt. Grijalva that Laura is the guilty party for refusing dates with him, and insists that she was the one messing with him. Laura finally manages to escape the building and is rushed to a hospital for surgery on her shoulder.

Richard continues his rampage, at one point executing one of his surviving victims, unknowingly shoots Chris through a wall, but also permits his former landlady Nancy to leave the building unharmed. Richard demands a sandwich and a beverage from the authorities while he considers surrendering. Hours later, the police produce the food and drink, but Grijalva tells Richard that they do not have the proper means of getting it to him. Overcome with exhaustion and dehydration, Richard agrees to surrender to the police. Seemingly unconcerned by the carnage he has caused, Richard asks Grijalva if he thinks Laura will remember all this.

Cast
 Richard Thomas as Richard Farley
 Brooke Shields as Laura Black
 Viveka Davis as Mary Ann, Laura's roommate.
 William Allen Young as Chris, Laura's section manager at K.E.I.
 Richard Yniguez as Lt. Grijalva, hostage negotiator.
 Scott Bryce as Sam Waters, Laura's boyfriend.
 T. Max Graham as Captain Olson, Police Captain.
 Tim Snay as Lt. Bannister, SWAT Officer.
 Kevin Brief as Lt. Mark Shegan, Police Officer.
 Linda Emond as Penny, HR person.
Dick Mueller as Tom Black.
Merle Moores as Donna Black.
Caroline Vinciguerra as Sarah Black.
Donna Thomason as Glenda Moritz, Laura's co-worker.
Hollis McCarthy as Phyllis, Laura's co-worker.
Barbara Houston as Nancy Hammond, Richard's co-worker and landlady.

Reception
John Marriott of Radio Times gave a positive review of Shields' and Thomas' performances but criticized the overall depth of characters in the film.

References

External links

1993 television films
1993 films
1990s crime drama films
American crime drama films
CBS network films
Films about stalking
Films scored by Sylvester Levay
Films set in the 1980s
Films set in the San Francisco Bay Area
Films about narcissism
Crime films based on actual events
Films directed by Michael Switzer
American drama television films
1990s English-language films
1990s American films